A grue is a fictional, predatory creature that dwells in the dark. The term was first used to identify a human-bat hybrid predator in the Dying Earth series. The term was then borrowed to introduce a similar monster in Zork, a 1977 interactive fiction computer game published by Infocom. Following Zork's massive commercial success, grues also appeared in other Infocom games such as Wishbringer, and eventually became geek culture figures. With Zorks prominent position in hacker history and lore, grues have become a reference model for monsters across generations of video games afterwards.

Zorks grues fear light and devour human adventurers, making it impossible to explore the game's dark areas without a light source. A common catchphrase associated with grues is a line in Zork, which is displayed whenever players enter a dark area without a light source: "It is pitch black. You are likely to be eaten by a grue."

Ur-grue 

In the fourth Zork game, Beyond Zork, an evil being called an "Ur-grue" is introduced as the primary villain. Though similar in name, the Ur-grue is significantly different from the classic grue, being more akin to an evil god than a simple predatory monster.

In popular culture
Even today the grue is used as a homage to classic, early computer gaming, and references to grues appear in the games NetHack, World of Warcraft, and Don't Starve. In the game Dunnet, if the player ventures beyond the Northbound Hallway without a lamp, the game will say, "It is pitch dark. You are likely to be eaten by a grue." In the psychological thriller game Alan Wake, when the protagonist turns off the lights in a cabin at one point, the character Barry Wheeler says "Fine, I'll just sit here in the dark, maybe get eaten by a grue." A reference to grues is also made in title and refrain of Nerdcore rapper MC Frontalot's song "It Is Pitch Dark".

On IGN's list of the "Top 100 Video Game Villains of All Time", the grue was listed as number 46. When summing up the creature and the development behind it IGN wrote, "The grue's presence may have been a handy solution to a very particular problem in the game design, but it has grown far beyond being a mere gameplay convenience to become one of the chief boogiemen in the early history of video games."

References

 Phyllida FitzGerald, "Gruesome Game!". The Sydney Morning Herald - Jul 28, 1985 (page 72 of 85)
 http://www.catb.org/jargon/html/G/grue.html
 http://www.escapistmagazine.com/news/view/102461-Get-Lamp-The-Text-Adventure-Documentary-Goes-Live

Characters in fantasy literature
Fictional monsters
Fictional predators
Infocom
Literary characters introduced in 1966
Video game antagonists
Video game species and races